Northern Power Systems was a company that designed, manufactured, and sold wind turbines. They also provided engineering development services and technology licenses for energy applications globally.  The company was founded in 1974, and grew into a multinational corporation headquartered in Barre, Vermont, with European headquarters in Zurich, Switzerland and a significant presence in the United Kingdom and Italy. The company closed in 2019 when its last business unit was sold to WEG Industries.

Northern Power Systems is credited as having been the original company that led to the formation of Northern Reliability, Inc. (NRI) and its entrance into energy storage.

Products 
Northern Power Systems manufactured the NPS 60 and NPS 100 wind turbines for community applications; The NPS 100 is rated as having a 100 kilowatt capacity, and the NPS 60 is rated as having a 60 kilowatt capacity. Northern Power Systems also manufactured the larger 2.3 megawatt turbine designed for industrial applications such as wind farms: named the Northern Power 2X platform.

References

Wind turbine manufacturers
Engineering companies of the United States
Manufacturing companies based in Vermont
1974 establishments in Vermont
American companies established in 1974